USRC Gallatin, was a Gallatin–class revenue cutter of the United States Revenue Cutter Service in commission from 1874 to 1892. The fourth ship of the Revenue Cutter Service to bear the name, she was named for the fourth U.S. Secretary of the Treasury, Albert Gallatin. 

Gallatin was laid down by the David Bell Company at Buffalo, New York, in 1871 and commissioned in 1874. She was equipped with an iron hull and a Fowler patent steering propeller, a six-bladed screw with a separate engine for steering and reversing. Installed in October 1871, the Fowler propeller proved unsatisfactory and required reconstruction. On 4 October 1873 a sea trial of the reconstructed Fowler steering propeller proved to be uneconomical failure and a contract to make alterations was negotiated in March 1874. The Fowler propeller was replaced by the David Bell Company. Gallatin was finally ordered to Boston, Massachusetts to begin patrol on 23 October 1874.

Gallatin was home-ported at Boston. She cruised the United States East Coast from Portsmouth, New Hampshire, to Holmes Hole, Massachusetts. She sank on 6 January 1892, off the northwest side of Boo Hoo Ledge in the Atlantic Ocean off Manchester, Maine, United States, with the loss of one life. The ships Carpenter Mr. J. Jacobson was killed instantly when he was struck by one of the toppling smokestacks. Her wreck is located at (42°33′50″N 70°44′52″W) in up to 50 feet (15 m) of water. The wreck was sold at auction as salvage for $679 roughly two months after the sinking.

Citations

References used
 
 
 

Schooners of the United States
Ships of the United States Revenue Cutter Service
Ships built in Buffalo, New York
1871 ships
Maritime incidents in 1892
Shipwrecks of the Massachusetts coast
Shipwrecks in the Atlantic Ocean